Saint Romulus may refer to:

Romulus of Genoa (fl. 4th century), early Bishop of Genoa
Romulus of Fiesole (fl. 1st century), patron saint of Fiesole, Italy
See Donatus, Romulus, Secundian, and 86 Companions for the martyr Romulus